Bryce Papenbrook (born February 24) is an American voice actor who has done voice work for Funimation, Bang Zoom! Entertainment, Viz Media, Animaze, Studiopolis and Scoffer Studios. He has voiced in several anime series, particularly those of young male protagonists.

Early life 
Bryce Papenbrook was born on February 24, the son of voice actors Debbie Rothstein (born 1956) and Bob Papenbrook (1955–2006). Papenbrook is half-Jewish, via his mother. He graduated from UCLA in 2007 with a bachelor's degree in political science.

Career 
Papenbrook is best known for his portrayals of Kirito in Sword Art Online, Eren Yeager in Attack on Titan, Inosuke Hashibira in Demon Slayer: Kimetsu no Yaiba, Rin Okumura in Blue Exorcist, Rokuro Enmado in Twin Star Exorcists, Masaomi Kida in Durarara!! series, Caesar Anthonio Zeppeli in JoJo's Bizarre Adventure, Shirou Emiya in Fate/stay night: Unlimited Blade Works, Meliodas & Zeldris in The Seven Deadly Sins, Red in Pokémon Origins, Adol Christin in the Ys series, Kaito in Ajin: Demi-Human, and Makoto Naegi and Nagito Komaeda in the Danganronpa series. In animation, he provides the voice of Adrien Agreste/Cat Noir in Miraculous: Tales of Ladybug & Cat Noir. Since 2019, he is the current voice of Silver the Hedgehog in the Sonic the Hedgehog series. He also voices Kaname Isaki in Nagi-Asu: A Lull in the Sea. As of 2022, he voices Drastic in the podcast Sky Brother Force.

Personal life
Papenbrook and his wife, Samantha, have three children together: a daughter named Ella Papenbrook (born September 5, 2015), a son named Griffin Papenbrook (born January 19, 2019) and a second daughter named Margo Papenbrook (born August 30, 2021).

Papenbrook began training in Chuck Norris' system of Tang Soo Do (also known as American Tang Soo Do) under his original instructor Steve Clark, and would later train and receive his fourth-degree black belt in the system under Clark's instructor Dennis Ichikawa. He is a three-time kickboxing champion with over 60 fights to his name. He occasionally works as a kickboxing instructor at the House of Champions Academy of Martial Arts in Van Nuys, California.

Before becoming well known for voice acting, he competed semi-professionally in e-sports with a focus on the game GoldenEye 007 on Nintendo 64.

Filmography

Anime

Animation

Film

Video games

References

External links

 
 
 

Living people
American male kickboxers
American male voice actors
Jewish American male actors
American people of German descent
American people of English descent
American people of Irish descent
University of California, Los Angeles alumni
People from West Hills, Los Angeles
21st-century American male actors
American male video game actors
American male film actors
American male television actors
Male actors from Los Angeles
21st-century American Jews
American tang soo do practitioners
American male karateka